Athanasios "Thanos" Mikroutsikos (13 April 1947 – 28 December 2019) was a Greek composer and politician. He is considered one of the most important composers of the recent Greek musical scene.

Biography

Personal life
He was born on 13 April 1947 in Patra. He was the older brother of Andreas Mikroutsikos, who is also a musician/composer and a television show host. His wife was children's author Maria Papagianni, whom he married in 1996. He died on 28 December 2019, after a long fight with cancer, at age 72.

Music
He studied piano and composition in the Philharmonic Society of Patras, in the Hellenic Conservatory, and privately with Yiannis Papaioannou. In addition, he studied Mathematics in the National and Kapodistrian University of Athens. He began composing at the end of the 1960s but only officially debuted in 1975, with the release of his album Politika Tragoudia ('Political Songs'). He continued on this compositional path, setting to music the poems of Giannis Ritsos, Vladimir Mayakovsky, Manos Eleftheriou and Bertold Brecht, amongst others.

His albums Kantata gia ti Makroniso (Cantata for Makronisos), Fouente Ovehouna (Fuenteovejuna), Troparia gia Foniades (Hymns for Murderers) and Mousiki Praxi Ston Brecht (Musical Practice on Brecht) are characteristic of the climate of Metapolitefsi or Regime Change that was taking place in the period 1975–78. In particular, the Cantata for Makronisos, a pioneering piece in which Mikroutsikos experimented with atonality was extremely well received in international music festivals and an interpretation of particular note was recorded by Maria Dimitriadi.

His next album, Stavros tou Notou (Southern Cross), set to the poetry of Nikos Kavvadias, opened up further musical avenues for him, combining theatre, electronic music and atonality (a second album, Grammes ton orizondon, set to the poetry of Kavvadias was released in 1991). With the same devotion to poetry, he continued to set the works of Giannis Ritsos, Alkis Alkaios, François Villon and Constantine P. Cavafy, amongst others. In addition, he has written an opera, Eleni (Helen) and set to music several children's fairytales.

He has worked with many renowned singers such as Maria Dimitriadi, Haris Alexiou, Manolis Mitsias, Dimitris Mitropanos, George Dalaras, Vasilis Papakonstantinou, Christos Thibaios, Miltiadis Paschalidis, Rita Antonopoulou and Giannis Koutras, amongst others. His music has been particularly well received and recognised in Western Europe. During his compositional career, he has managed to liberate the form of Greek song, adding together elements from the modernist and classical western tradition. He also experimented with the combination of tonal and atonal sounds and with morphological variation.

He was artistic director of the New Music Society and the Musical Analogion, whilst he also worked with and directed the Patras International Festival.

Politics

He was involved in Greece's political life since the 1960s. During the turbulent years of the Greek military junta of 1967–1974, he was persecuted by the regime for his anti-dictatorial activities and ideas. When the junta collapsed, he continued being actively involved in politics as a member of the maoist EKKE, especially in the first years after the restoration of democracy.

After the elections of October 1993, he was appointed as Deputy Minister of Culture by the new Panhellenic Socialist Movement (PASOK) government, serving alongside the late Melina Mercouri who was Minister of Culture. He was appointed to Mercouri's position when she died in 1994, a position he kept until 1996.

He was a supporter of the Communist Party of Greece.

Discography

References

External links 
 

1947 births
2019 deaths
Politicians from Patras
National and Kapodistrian University of Athens alumni
21st-century classical composers
Greek entehno singers
Greek classical pianists
Greek communists
PASOK politicians
Male classical composers
Culture ministers of Greece
Male classical pianists
21st-century classical pianists
21st-century Greek male singers
Musicians from Patras
20th-century Greek male singers